Idah Lik (also Romanized as Īdah Līk; also known as Īdalīk, Igdālīq, and Īldalīk) is a village in Kabud Gonbad Rural District, in the Central District of Kalat County, Razavi Khorasan Province, Iran. At the 2006 census, its population was 914, in 227 families.

References 

Populated places in Kalat County